Pine River (or with other terms for watercourses; or with plural form "Pins") in Quebec, Canada; may refer to:

 Rivière aux Pins (disambiguation)
 Rivière des Pins (disambiguation)

See also
 Rivière (disambiguation)
 River (disambiguation)
 Pins (disambiguation)
 Pin (disambiguation)
 Pine (disambiguation)
 Pines (disambiguation)